Before the independence of South Sudan, the States of Sudan were subdivided into 133 districts. With the adoption of the Interim National Constitution of Sudan  and the Interim Constitution of Southern Sudan, the ten states of South Sudan are, however, now divided into counties.  The maps on this page represent the boundaries as they existed in 2006. Current information is available from the Humanitarian Data Exchange.

The districts are listed below, by state:



Al Jazirah
 Al Kamlin District
 East al Gazera District
 North al Gazera District
 Al Managil District
 South al Gazera District
 Um Al Gura District
 Wad Madani District

Al Qadarif

 Al Faw District
 Al Gadaref District
 Al Rahd District
 East Galabat District
 West Galabat District
 Al Fushqa District
 Butana District

Blue Nile

 Ad Damazin District
 Al Roseires District
 Geissan District
 Baw District
 Al Kurumik District

Kassala

 Seteet District
 Nahr Atbara District
 Kassala District
 Al Gash District
 Hamashkorieb District

Khartoum

 Khartoum District
 Um Badda District
 Omdurman District
 Karary District
 Khartoum Bahri District
 Sharg En Nile District
 South Khartoum District

North Darfur
(Not representing the present state structure)

 Mellit District
 Kutum District
 Kabkabiya District
 Al Fasher District
 Um Kadada District

North Kurdufan

 Sowdari District
 Jebrat al Sheikh District
 Sheikan District
 Bara District
 Um Rawaba District
 En Nuhud District
 Ghebeish District

Northern

 Wadi Halfa District
 Dongola District
 Merawi District
 Addabah District

Red Sea

 Halayeb District
 Port Sudan District
 Sinkat District
 Tokar District

River Nile

 Abu Hamad District
 Berber District
 Ad Damer District
 Atbara District
 Shendi District
 Al Matammah District

Sennar

 Sennar District
 Singa District
 Ad Dinder District

South Darfur
(Not reflecting the present state structure)

 Kas District
 Edd al Fursan District
 Nyala District
 Shearia District
 Al Deain District
 Adayala District
 Buram District
 Tulus District
 Rehed al Birdi District

South Kurdufan

 Dilling District
 Rashad District
 Abu Jubaiyah District
 Talodi District
 Kadugli District
 Lagawa District
 As Salam District
 Abyei District

West Darfur
(Not representing the present state structure)

 Kulbus District
 Al Geneina District
 Zallingi District
 Jebel Marra District
 Habillah District
 Wadi Salih District
 Mukjar District

White Nile

 Ad Douiem District
 Al Gutaina District
 Kosti District
 Al Jabalian District

See also 
States of Sudan
Districts of the Southern Sudan

References

External links 

 
Subdivisions of Sudan
Sudan, Districts
Sudan 2
Districts, Sudan
Sudan geography-related lists